was a town located in Tomata District, Okayama Prefecture, Japan.

As of 2003, the town had an estimated population of 5,311 and a density of 33.35 persons per km2. The total area was 159.27 km2.

On February 28, 2005, Kamo, along with the village of Aba (also from Tomata District), the town of Shōboku (from Katsuta District), and the town of Kume (from Kume District), was merged into the expanded city of Tsuyama and no longer exists as an independent municipality.

Massacre
On 21 May 1938, the town became the scene of the deadliest shooting by a lone gunman in Japanese history. A 21-year-old man murdered 30 people (including his own grandmother) and wounded three others before killing himself.

Geography

Adjoining municipalities
Okayama Prefecture
Tsuyama
Kagamino
Kamisaibara
Aba
Shōboku
Tottori Prefecture
Tottori
Chizu

Education
Kamo Elementary School
Kamo Junior High School

Transportation

Railways
West Japan Railway Company
Imbi Line
Mimasaka-Kamo Station - Chiwa Station - Mimasaka-Kawai Station

Road
Prefectural roads:
Okayama Prefectural Route 6 (Tsuyama-Chizu-Hattō)
Okayama Prefectural Route 68 (Tsuyama-Kamo)
Okayama Prefectural Route 75 (Kamo-Okutsu)
Okayama Prefectural Route 118 (Kamo-Mochigase)
Okayama Prefectural Route 336 (Kurami-Sainotani)

References

External links
Official website of Tsuyama in Japanese (some English content)

Dissolved municipalities of Okayama Prefecture
Tsuyama